Humanistic historiography is a method in historiography based on the principles of humanism. The new style of (humanistic) historiography was established by the Florentine History of Bruni (published from 1416 to 1449), and certain characteristics of the model still determined the treatment of political history in Machiavelli's Istorie Firoentine, as well as his delimitation of political subject matter at large.

Let us briefly enumerate these characteristics. The humanists used Livy as their model. This choice had certain consequences insofar as the treatment of history had to concentrate on such exciting events as wars and revolutions to the exclusion of the permanent factors and the long-range developments that determine the texture of history.

Moreover, in the interest of rhetorical and dramatic effectiveness, the individual had to become the center of action to such a degree that again the permanent determinants that in fact leave not so much room for heroic freedom were obscured.

The Roman model had, furthermore, the effect of a radical secularization of political problems. The humanistic concentration on the history of the republic in the Roman manner entailed the break with the Christian view of history. The rigidly closed stream of secular state history did not admit a divine Providence governing a universal history. Such problems as the translatio imperii and the speculation of the four world monarchies disappeared without a word of discussion.

In the eighteenth century, when Voltaire started his secularization of history, the polemic against the Christian position of Bossuet was of absorbing interest. The humanists of the fifteenth century ignored the Christian problem as if it did not exist.

References

External links
 Humanistic Historiography Under the Sforzas: Politics and Propaganda in Fifteenth-century Milan
 Humanistic historiography in Academia
 Humanistic Historiography

Humanism
Historiography